Elbrus Isakov (born 1 March 1981) is an Azerbaijani alpine skier. He competed in the men's slalom at the 2002 Winter Olympics.

References

1981 births
Living people
Azerbaijani male alpine skiers
Olympic alpine skiers of Azerbaijan
Alpine skiers at the 2002 Winter Olympics
People from Rustavi